Gloriana ornata is a moth of the family Noctuidae. It is found in Nepal and India.

References

Moths described in 1882
Calpinae